Daniel Pavlov (born November 6, 1967 in Cherven Bryag) is an athlete from Bulgaria, who competes in archery.

2008 Summer Olympics 
At the 2008 Summer Olympics in Beijing Pavlov finished his ranking round with a total of 618 points, which gave him the 59th seed for the final competition bracket in which he faced Balzhinima Tsyrempilov in the first round. Tsyrempilov won the match by 112-102 and Pavlov was eliminated. Tsyrempilov would lose in the third round against Ryuichi Moriya.

External links

References 

1967 births
Living people
Bulgarian male archers
Archers at the 2008 Summer Olympics
Olympic archers of Bulgaria